Ramón Castro is the name of:

Ramón Castro Ruz (1924–2016), figure in Cuban politics, and the brother of Fidel and Raúl Castro
Ramón Castro (catcher) (born 1976), Puerto Rican professional baseball player
Ramón Castro (third baseman) (born 1979), Venezuelan professional baseball player
Ramón Castro Jijón (1915–1984), president of Ecuador
Ramón Castro y Ramírez (1795–1867), Costa Rican politician
Ramón Víctor Castro (born 1964), former Uruguayan footballer. Following his playing career, Castro became a football manager in Chile